George Calhern (born May 9, 1951) is a sprinter who represents the United States Virgin Islands. He competed in the men's 100 metres at the 1972 Summer Olympics.

References

1951 births
Living people
Athletes (track and field) at the 1972 Summer Olympics
United States Virgin Islands male sprinters
Olympic track and field athletes of the United States Virgin Islands
Place of birth missing (living people)